Cylindropuntia is a genus of cacti (family Cactaceae), containing species commonly known as chollas, native to northern Mexico and the Southwestern United States. They are known for their barbed spines that tenaciously attach to skin, fur, and clothing.
Stands of cholla are called cholla gardens. Individuals within these colonies often exhibit the same DNA, as they were formerly tubercles of an original plant.

Taxonomy
Cylindropuntia was formerly treated as a subgenus of Opuntia, but have now been separated based on their cylindrical stems (Opuntia species have flattened stems) and the presence of papery epidermal sheaths on the spines (Opuntia has no sheaths). A few species of mat- or clump-forming opuntioid cacti are currently placed in the genus Grusonia. Collectively, opuntias, chollas, and related plants are sometimes called opuntiads.

The roughly 35 species of Cylindropuntia are native to the southwestern and south-central United States, Mexico, and the West Indies. The Flora of North America recognizes 22 species. Some species have been introduced to South America (Chile, Ecuador, Peru) and South Africa.

Species
, Plants of the World Online accepts the following species:

Hybrids
Some hybrids are also known:
Cylindropuntia × antoniae P.V.Heath
Cylindropuntia × campii (M.A.Baker & Pinkava) M.A.Baker & Pinkava
Cylindropuntia × cardenche (Griffiths) F.M.Knuth
Cylindropuntia × congesta (Griffiths) F.M.Knuth
Cylindropuntia × deserta (Griffiths) Pinkava
Cylindropuntia × grantiorum P.V.Heath
Cylindropuntia × kelvinensis (V.E.Grant & K.A.Grant) P.V.Heath
Cylindropuntia × neoarbuscula (Griffiths) F.M.Knuth
Cylindropuntia × pallida (Rose) F.M.Knuth
Cylindropuntia × tetracantha (Toumey) F.M.Knuth
Cylindropuntia × viridiflora (Britton & Rose) F.M.Knuth
Cylindropuntia × vivipara (Rose) F.M.Knuth

Cholla wood in pet trade
Dried, dead Cylindropuntia sections are called "cholla wood" and are popular in the pet trade. In aquariums they are immersed partly or entirely into the water for pets to swim through, and in terrariums and other terrestrial pet enclosures they are placed and propped up for climbing.

Notes

References

External links

 USDA Plants Profile for Cylindropuntia (cholla)
  Flora of North America: Key for Cylindropuntia

 
Cacti of Mexico
Cacti of the United States
North American desert flora
Opuntioideae genera
Taxa named by George Engelmann